Anatoliy Matviyenko (March 22, 1953 – May 22, 2020) was a Ukrainian politician, founder of several political parties in the country. Matviyenko was 6 times elected to the Ukrainian parliament.

Biography
Matviyenko was born on March 22, 1953 in Bershad, Vinnytsia Oblast, to a working-class family. In 1975 he graduated the Lviv Agrarian Institute, Agrarian Mechanization faculty.

Between 1975 and 1977 Matviyenko worked as a mechanic in Bershad. From 1977 he was an activist of Komsomol (LKSMU) and by 1985 became a secretary of the Central Committee of LKSMU. In 1989-91 Matviyenko became the first secretary of the Ukrainian Komsomol and became a member of the Communist Party of Ukraine.

In the 1990 Ukrainian Supreme Soviet election Matviyenko was elected to the Ukrainian parliament.

Matviyenko was Governor of Vinnytsia Oblast between 1996 and 1998. In February 1996 Matviyenko became member and leader of the new People's Democratic Party.

Matviyenko returned to the Ukrainian parliament in the 1998 Ukrainian parliamentary election for the People's Democratic Party. He also was the party's faction leader. But Matviyenko left this party after accusing the party of being forced into supporting Leonid Kuchma in the 1999 Ukrainian presidential election. In December 1999 Matviyenko was one of the 
founders and first leader of the Ukrainian Republican Party "Sobor". In February 2001 he joined the council of the anti-Kuchma National Salvation Committee.

In the 2002 Ukrainian parliamentary election Matviyenko was elected for the Yulia Tymoshenko Bloc, he was placed second on its election list after Yulia Tymoshenko. From 20 April 2005 to 21 September 2005 Matviyenko  was Prime Minister of Crimea. In September 2005 he resigned from the post in protest against the fact that his party members did not support the candidacy of Yuriy Yekhanurov for the post of Prime Minister of Ukraine.

Matviyenko briefly worked for the Secretariat of the President of Ukraine (at the time Viktor Yushchenko) early 2006. In the 2006 Ukrainian parliamentary election he was elected again to  parliament for the Our Ukraine Bloc (number 12 on its electoral list). He was reelected in the 2007 Ukrainian parliamentary election for the Our Ukraine–People's Self-Defense Bloc (number 22 on the list).

Matviyenko was registered as an independent candidate in his native Vinnytsia Oblast during the 2012 Ukrainian parliamentary election, but withdrew his candidacy in favour of Hryhoriy Zabolotny of UDAR who indeed gained a parliamentary seat (gaining 46.73% of the votes).

In the 2014 Ukrainian parliamentary election Matviyenko was again elected into parliament; after placing 32nd on the electoral list of Petro Poroshenko Bloc.
In October 2016 it was reported that he had declared ownership of a private church.

Matviyenko died on 22 May 2020, at the age of 67.

Matviyenko was married to Olha, and had two sons Viktor and Pavlo.

References

External links
 Who is who at the Ukraine Official.
 Biography

1953 births
2020 deaths
People from Bershad
Prime Ministers of Crimea
Governors of Vinnytsia Oblast
Komsomol of Ukraine members
Communist Party of Ukraine (Soviet Union) politicians
Toiling Congress of Ukraine politicians
People's Democratic Party (Ukraine) politicians
Republican Platform politicians
Recipients of the Order of Merit (Ukraine), 3rd class
Petro Poroshenko Bloc politicians
Eighth convocation members of the Verkhovna Rada
First convocation members of the Verkhovna Rada
Third convocation members of the Verkhovna Rada
Fourth convocation members of the Verkhovna Rada
Fifth convocation members of the Verkhovna Rada
Sixth convocation members of the Verkhovna Rada